The 2009 Harlequins Rugby League season was the thirtieth in the club's history and their fourteenth season in the Super League. The club was coached by Brian McDermott, competing in Super League XIV, finishing in 11th place and reaching the Fourth round of the 2009 Challenge Cup.

Harlequins RL – the only team in the Super League based in a capital city (London) attracted an average home crowd of just under 3,500.

2009 Harlequins Rugby League squad

Transfers
Transfers for 2009 (In)

Transfers for 2009 (Out)

2009 Fixtures and results

: Game called off due to flooded pitch.

: Game rearranged to make Harlequins RL available for a Manly-Warringah Sea Eagles' warm-up game for the 2009 World Club Challenge.

1: Game postponed due to frozen pitch.

Super League XIV table

References

External links
London Broncos - Rugby League Project
Harlequins RL's official website

London Broncos seasons
Harlequins Rugby League
Harlequins Rugby League season